Wayne Gibbens (born October 1, 1937) is an American politician. He served as a Democratic member in the Texas House of Representatives from 1961 to 1966.

References

External links

|-

1937 births
Living people
Democratic Party members of the Texas House of Representatives